Chief Decorator Elmer Garnsey, as a part of the mural decoration, worked with Capitol Architect Cass Gilbert to create a list of quotes to be used in the Minnesota State Capitol. The list was submitted to the commission for examination and revision. Originally there were in all 51 inscriptions in different places about the building, from 39 different men.

Inscriptions in Staircase Hall, Second Floor, Senate Side

 The true grandeur of nations is in those equalities which constitute the true greatness of the individual. ~Charles Sumner
 Labor to keep alive in your heart that little spark of celestial fire called Conscience. ~President George Washington
 The proper function of a government is to make it easy for the people to do good, and difficult for them to do evil. ~William Ewart Gladstone
 No government is respectable which is not just. ~Daniel Webster
 The liberty of a people consists in being governed by laws which they have made themselves. ~Abraham Cowley
 Education is a better safeguard of liberty than a standing army.~Edward Everett
 Eternal vigilance is the price of liberty. ~President Thomas Jefferson
 True liberty consists in the privilege of enjoying our own rights; not in the destruction of the rights of others. ~Charles C. Pinckney
 If we mean to support the liberty and independence which have cost us so much blood and treasure to establish, we must drive far away the demon of party spirit and local reproach. ~President George Washington
 Equal and exact justice to all men, of whatever state or persuasion, religious or political; peace, commerce and honest friendship with all nations, entangling alliances with none. ~President Thomas Jefferson
 Next in importance to freedom and justice is popular education, without which neither justice nor freedom can be permanently maintained. ~President James Garfield
 Education is our only political safety. ~Horace Mann
 Let us ever remember that our interest is in concord, not conflict, and that our real eminence rests in the victories of peace, not those of war. ~President William McKinley
 Nothing is politically right which is morally wrong. ~Daniel O'Connell
 Eternal good citizenship is the price of good government. ~Elihu Root
 Votes should be weighed, not counted. ~Friedrich Schiller
 War's legitimate object is more perfect peace. ~Gen. William T. Sherman
 To be prepared for war is one of the most effectual means of preserving peace. ~President George Washington. 
 Let us have peace. ~Gen. Ulysses S. Grant

Inscriptions in Staircase Hall, Second Floor, Supreme Court Side

 Justice is the idea of God, the ideal of man. ~Theodore Parker
 Law is the embodiment of the moral sentiment of the people. ~William Blackstone
 The people's safety is the law of God. ~James Otis Jr.
 The absolute justice of the state, enlightened by the perfect reason of the state, that is law. ~Rufus Choate
 God's laws make it easier to do right, and harder to do wrong. ~William Ewart Gladstone
 Laws are the very bulwarks of liberty; they define every man's rights, and defend the individual liberties of all men. ~Josiah Gilbert Holland
 The science of jurisprudence, the pride of the human intellect, with all its defects, redundancies and errors, is the collected reason of ages. ~Edmund Burke
 Of law there can be no less acknowledged than that her seat is the bosom of God, her voice the harmony of the world. ~Richard Hooker
 Ignorance of the law excuses no man. ~John Selden
 The best way to get a bad law repealed is to enforce it strictly. ~Abraham Lincoln
 First make him obey the law, then remove the cause that in cites him to law-breaking. ~Wilson
 Law is a science which employs in its theory the noblest faculties of the soul, and exerts in its practice the cardinal virtues of the heart. ~William Blackstone
 Justice is the constant desire and effort to render to every man his due. ~Justinian
 Impartiality is the life of justice, as justice is of all good government. ~Justinian
 Reason is the life of law, nay, the common law it self is nothing else but reason. ~Edward Coke
 The law is made to protect the innocent by punishing the guilty. ~Daniel Webster
 To embarrass justice by a multiplicity of laws, or to hazard it by confidence in judges, are the opposite rocks on which all civil institutions have been wrecked. ~Samuel Johnson
 Empires place their reliance upon sword and cannon; republics put their trust in the citizens' respect for law. If law be not sacred, a free government will not endure. ~Archbishop John Ireland

South Lunette, Opposite Dome, Third Floor
The amelioration of the condition of mankind, and the increase of human happiness, ought to be the leading objects of every political institution, and the aim of every individual, according to the measure of his power, in the situation he occupies. ~Alexander Hamilton.

North Lunette, Opposite Dome, Third Floor
Liberty consists in the right of each individual to exercise the greatest freedom of action up to, and not beyond that point where it impinges upon the like exercise of freedom of action of every other man. ~Cushman K. Davis

Above Entrance to Supreme Court, Second Floor
Justice is the great interest of man on earth. It is the ligament which holds civilized
nations together. Wherever her temple stands so long as it is duly honored there is a foundation for social security, general happiness, and the improvement and progress of our race. ~Daniel Webster

Senate Chamber
Let us develop the resources of our land, call forth its powers, build up its institutions, promote all its great interests, and see whether we also, in our day and generation, may not perform something worthy to be remembered. ~Daniel Webster

House Chamber
We hold these truths to be self-evident, that all men are created equal. That they are endowed by their Creator with certain inalienable rights. That among them are life, liberty, and the pursuit of happiness. ~Thomas Jefferson.

No free government or the blessings of liberty can be preserved to any people but by a firm adherence to justice, moderation, temperance, frugality and virtue, and by a frequent recurrence to fundamental principles. ~Patrick Henry.

Inscriptions added later in 1930s

The Trail of the Pioneer bore the Footprints of Liberty.
 
Vox Populorum Est Vox Dei. 
(Latin, 'the voice of the people is the voice of God')

Others
Aside from the above inscriptions painted on the walls, the following have been cut into the wood or marble, in their respective places:

Over Fireplace, in House Retiring Room
Free and fair discussion will ever be found the firmest friend of truth. ~George Campbell.

On Fireplace, in House Retiring Room
Measure not dispatch by the times of sitting, but by the advancement of business. ~Francis Bacon.

Inside Main Entrance to House 
Reason is the life of law. ~Edward Coke.

Inside Senate, Over Door Casing
The noblest motive is the public good. ~Virgil.

Inside Supreme Court, Over Door Casing
Where law ends tyranny begins. ~John Locke.

References

inscriptions